Dubno (also given as Dubno Northeast) is an air base in Ukraine located 7 km northeast of Dubno.  It is a military base with several angled taxiways, capable of parking about 50 fighters.

References
RussianAirFields.com

Soviet Air Force bases
Soviet Frontal Aviation
Ukrainian airbases
Airports in Ukraine